Zola Saphetha is a South African trade unionist. He was elected general secretary of the National Education, Health and Allied Workers' Union in 2017.

Career 
Born in the Eastern Cape, Saphetha joined the Congress of South African Students while at school and rose to become its provincial chair.  He studied at the Port Elizabeth Technikon, where he became regional chair of the South African Students Congress, then president of the SRC, and general secretary of the South African Technikon Student Union. While active in the student movement, he helped establish the South African Union of Students. In 1990, Saphetha was elected as the African National Congress's (ANC) political commissar for Pankie Dobo, and he served on the party's regional executive for Port Elizabeth.

On leaving education, Saphetha began working at the University of Durban-Westville. He joined the National Education, Health and Allied Workers' Union (NEHAWU), becoming a shop steward and then branch chair. In 2008, he was elected as NEHAWU's regional chair for KwaZulu-Natal, and before the end of the year was also its acting provincial secretary.  In 2012, he was elected as secretary on a permanent basis, then in 2014, he won election as deputy general secretary of NEHAWU.

Saphetha was elected as general secretary of NEHAWU in 2017. In this role, he threatened to withdraw union support from the ANC unless it concedes to some of the union's demands. In 2019, he was additionally elected as general secretary of the Trade Union International of Public Services and Allied Employees.

Personal life 
He is married to ANC politician Ntombikayise Sibhidla-Saphetha with two children.

References

Living people
South African trade unionists
1979 births